bTV is the first private nationwide television channel in Bulgaria. It is operated by bTV Media Group, as part of Central European Media Enterprises, and is reportedly the Bulgarian television channel with the largest viewing audience. It was previously owned by Balkan News Corporation, part of News Corporation. On February 18, 2010, News Corp announced that it had agreed to sell 94% of bTV (along with bTV Comedy and bTV Cinema) to Central European Media Enterprises, after many months of negotiations. The US$400M deal was completed in the second quarter of 2010. bTV has a 37% market share in Bulgaria.

bTV is broadcast terrestrially in Bulgaria and by satellite internationally. Most of the channel's original content is available on its Internet site. bTV's first broadcast was on 1 June 2000 using BNT transmitters for Efir 2. The channel began broadcasting 24 hours a day on February 18, 2001, after having gradually extended its program. On October 7, 2012, the channel began broadcasting an HD version, and the old SD channel converted to 16:9 for most newer programs.

bTV is the leading channel in bTV Media Group along with - bTV Comedy, bTV Cinema, bTV Action, bTV Lady and RING. bTV also owns six radio stations - bTV Radio, N-JOY, Z-Rock, Classic FM, and Jazz FM.

Programmes 
bTV airs reality shows like Idol (under the name Music Idol, 2007–2009), six seasons of Survivor (see Survivor BG, 2006–2009, 2014, 2022-), eight seasons of Got Talent (see Balgariya tarsi talant, 2010, 2012, 2014–2016,2019,2021-), the first two Bulgarian seasons of Dancing with the Stars (under the name Dancing Stars, 2008–2009), one season of Beauty and the Geek(2005), three seasons of Fort Boyard(2008-2010), two seasons of Psychic Challenge (under the name Yasnovidtsi, 2008–2009), one season of Lord of the Chefs, (2011), eight seasons of The Voice of... (under the name The Voice of Bulgaria, 2011, 2013–2014, 2017-), eight seasons of MasterChef (2015-2021, 2023), seven seasons of The Farm (under the name Fermata, 2015-) and TV games like  Are You Smarter Than a 5th Grader? (under the name Tova go znae vsyako hlape" "Every kid knows that", 2007–2009). bTV also broadcast the Bulgarian version of ABC`s show The Dating Game under the name Love games (Gorchivo, 2007-2009). The first season of the Bulgarian version of the slovak TV show Modre Z Neba (Best wishes) was aired in the fall of 2012 under the name Predaj natatak i.e. Pass it on. The first season of the Bulgarian version of the German comedy show  Schillerstraße was aired in 2013, under the name Mladost 5, that is the name of a quarter in Sofia. In the fall of 2013 bTV offered the viewers 4 brand new TV shows in primetime - the first season of the Bulgarian version of Star Safari under the name Afrika: zvezdite sigurno sa poludeli (i.e.  Africa: the stars must've gone mad), the Bulgarian version of The Price Is Right - That's the price, a new culinary show - A Pinch of Salt (local version of Gordon Ramsay: Cookalong Live) and the Bulgarian version of the Italian comedy show Striscia la notizia under the name The Naked Truth (Golata istina). bTV also produces the Bulgarian versions of My mom cooks better than yours, Extreme Makeover: Home Edition (under the name Brigada: Nov dom), Hollywood Game Night (under the name Igrite na zvezdite), The Story of my life, Wife swap (Smeni zhenata, 2017–2020, 2022) , The Nikolas Tsitiridis Show from 2020, the Bulgarian version of The bachelor (Ergenat, 2022 -) and the Bulgarian version of Who wants to be a millionaire? (Stani Bogat, 2021-).

Popular American TV series such as Monk (all of the seasons), The O.C. (all seasons), Desperate Housewives (seasons 1–6), Ghost Whisperer (seasons 1–3), Grey's Anatomy (seasons 1–6), Battlestar Galactica (all the seasons), Alf (all the seasons), Friends (all seasons), Ally McBeal (all seasons), The Unit (season 1), The 4400 (season 1), American Heiress (all the episodes), The Middle (seasons 1–3), Nikita (seasons 1–2), Pretty Little Liars (seasons 1–2), The Vampire Diaries (seasons 1–3), The Lying Game (all the seasons), Two and a Half Men (seasons 1–9), Dallas (all seasons), Desire (all the episodes) and many others were or are also part of bTV's programme. A lot of Turkish series are still part of the schedule of television. In the Summer of 2011 bTV first aired a Korean series - Iris and in the Summer of 2013 again first aired an Indian soap opera - Sapna Babul Ka...Bidaai and Diya Aur Baati Hum.

One of the most popular bTV show is Slavi's Show. It has been airing from November 27, 2000, to July 31, 2019, every workday from 22:30 to 23:30 EET with the host and producer Slavi Trifonov. The show has 4176 episodes. Other popular bTV shows are Before Noon (an everyday talk-show), The Comedians and friends (a comedy show), Paparazzi, Marmalad (a weekend game show), COOL...T (a lifestyle show) and others. One of the most successful bTV shows is the documentary reality - That's life - it has 12 seasons and is broadcast every Saturday or Sunday afternoon.

bTV News is the most watched newscast in Bulgaria. The first news emission was on the 18th of November 2000. The bTV News is broadcast workdays at 7:00, 8:00, 9:00, 12:00, 17:00, 19:00 and 23:00 EET and at 12:00, 19:00 EET during the weekends. The morning information blocs are This Morning (Monday-Friday), This Saturday (every Saturday), and This Sunday (every Sunday). bTV The Reporters and bTV The Documents are special shows for in-depth investigation and documentary series. bTV The Reporters is broadcast every weekend after of bTV The News airs - around 19:30 EET Other information shows are Face to Face (workdays, 17:30–18:00 EET) and Karbovski: Vtori plan.

The first Bulgarian TV series, produced by bTV was the Bulgarian remake of Un gars, une fille with its local title Her and Him. It has 3 seasons aired on bTV and its last, fourth season, was produced and aired on Fox Life. bTV also airs other home-made Bulgarian series like Glass Home with its 5 seasons. Its producer was SIA and Dimitar Mitovski. Other Bulgarian TV series, produced by bTV are Citizens in more, Seven Hours Difference, House Arrest, Where is Magi? (a remake of ¿Dónde Está Elisa?), Revolution Z, The Family, Relations and Where is My Elder Brother? and Rakia Sunrise (as part of The Slavi Show).

bTV International 
On 1 June 2016 bTV launched an international version of the channel, aimed at the Bulgarian diaspora. The channel airs the publicists programming of bTV like "This Morning", "This Sunday/Saturday", "120 Minutes", "Face to face" and others, the news bulletins of the network, other lifestyle shows like "Before Lunch", "Marmalade", "Paparazzi" and "The Comedians", as well as reruns of bTV Media Group's original series. On 13 December 2016, the channel was registered for cable broadcasting in Bulgaria.

Logos

References

Television networks in Bulgaria
Bulgarian-language television stations
Former News Corporation subsidiaries
Television channels and stations established in 2000